Cedar Grove is an unincorporated community in Sullivan County, Tennessee, United States. Cedar Grove is located near the northern border of Kingsport, west of Tennessee State Route 93.

Notes

Unincorporated communities in Sullivan County, Tennessee
Unincorporated communities in Tennessee